In organic chemistry, spiro compounds are compounds that have at least two molecular rings with only one common atom. The simplest spiro compounds are bicyclic (having just two rings), or have a bicyclic portion as part of the larger ring system, in either case with the two rings connected through the defining single common atom.  The one common atom connecting the participating rings distinguishes spiro compounds from other bicyclics: from isolated ring compounds like biphenyl that have no connecting atoms, from fused ring compounds like decalin having two rings linked by two adjacent atoms, and from bridged ring compounds  like norbornane with two rings linked by two non-adjacent atoms. 

Spiro compounds may be fully carbocyclic (all carbon) or heterocyclic (having one or more non-carbon atom). One common type of spiro compound encountered in educational settings is a heterocyclic one— the acetal formed by reaction of a diol with a cyclic ketone. The common atom that connects the two (or sometimes three) rings is called the spiro atom; in carbocyclic spiro compounds like spiro[5.5]undecane (see image at right), the spiro-atom is a quaternary carbon, and as the -ane ending implies, these are the types of molecules to which the name spirane was first applied (though it is now used general of all spiro compounds). Likewise, a tetravalent neutral silicon or positively charged quaternary nitrogen atom (ammonium cation) can be the spiro center in these compounds, and many of these have been prepared and described. The 2-3 rings being joined are most often different in nature, though they, on occasion, be identical [e.g., spiro[5.5]undecane, just shown, and spiropentadiene, at right]. Although sketches of organic structures makes spiro compounds appear planar, they are not; for instance, a spiro compound with a pair of three-membered cyclopropene rings connected in spiro fashion (image below) has been given the popular misnomer of  being a bow tie structure, when it is not flat or planar like a bow tie. This can be stated another way, saying that the best-fit planes to each ring are often perpendicular or are otherwise non-coplanar to one another.

Spiro compounds are present throughout the natural world, some cases of which have been exploited to provide tool compounds for biomedical study and to serve as scaffolds for the design of therapeutic agents with novel shapes. As well, the spiro motif is present in various practical compound types (such as dyes), as well as in a wide variety of oligo- and polymeric materials designs, for the unique shapes and properties the spiro center imparts, e.g., in the design of electronically active materials in particular. In both cases, the presence of the spiro center, often with four distinct groups attached, and with its unique aspects of chirality, adds unique challenges to the chemical synthesis of each compound type.

Carbocyclic spiro compounds

Bicyclic ring structures in organic chemistry that have two fully carbocyclic (all carbon) rings connected through just one atom are present both in natural products, as well as in esoteric targets of chemical synthesis. The two carbocycles can be different in nature, or identical. In common targets derived from natural products, they are essentially always different. In esoteric targets, such as highly strained hydrocarbons like spiropentadiene, shown here, the rings can be identical. The atom connecting the two rings is called the spiro-atom; in carbocyclic spiro compounds, the spiro-atom is a quaternary carbon.  The 11-carbon bicyclic structure shown above, spiro[5.5]undecane, is also a fully carbocyclic spiro compound. While the presentation of this structure makes it appear fully planar, it is not. The best-fit planes to each six-atom ring above is near to perpendicular, and the best-fit planes to rings of spiro compounds are likewise generally non-coplanar. For instance, the structure of faux bow tie spiropentadiene, shown above, makes clear that the planes that are defined by the atoms of each ring—i.e., the best-fit plane of each cyclopropene—are orthogonal (perpendicular) to one another.

Heterocyclic spiro compounds
 
Spiro compounds are considered heterocyclic if the spiro atom or any atom in either ring are not carbon atoms. Cases include the presence of a spiro heteroatom such silicon and nitrogen (but also other Group IVA [14] and other atom types) connecting the rings that have been observed or are under theoretical study; moreover, there are also many cases where one or more heteroatoms appear in one or more of the rings that are joined at a carbon spiro atom (e.g., where 1 oxygen spironolactones and 2 oxygen/2 sulfur ketals/thioketals are very common).

A common case is the presence of two atoms that are not carbon in one of the rings, with those two rings both attached to the spiro atom; indeed, often the earliest exposure of a chemist in training to a spiro compound is to a heterocyclic form, the ketal (acetal) formed in the protection of ketones by diols and dithiols. An example of this is shown above, in the synthesis of the acetal 1,4-dioxaspiro[4.5]decane from cyclohexanone and ethanediol. In this case, because the four atoms attached to the spiro atom are not all carbons, the spiro atom is not a quaternary carbon. A further example of an acetal formed from a cyclic ketone, except with a dithiol, is the spiro compound spirapril, which has a five-membered ring formed from 1,2-ethanedithiol. Again, while the rings could be identical, in the heterocyclic case they are, again, almost always non-identical. Once again, the best-fit planes to each ring are generally non-coplanar to one another (i.e., the rings are not coplanar, despite appearing so in images).

Polyspiro compounds
A polyspiro compound is connected by two or more spiroatoms making up three or more rings.

Nomenclature
 
Nomenclature for spiro compounds was first discussed by Adolf von Baeyer in 1900. The prefix spiro denotes two rings with a spiro junction. The main method of systematic nomenclature is to follow with square brackets containing the number of atoms in the smaller ring then the number of atoms in the larger ring, separated by a period, in each case excluding the spiroatom (the atom by which the two rings are bonded) itself. Position-numbering starts with an atom of the smaller ring adjacent to the spiroatom around the atoms of that ring, then the spiroatom itself, then around the atoms of the larger ring. For example, compound A in the image is called 1-bromo-3-chlorospiro[4.5]decan-7-ol, and compound B is called 1-bromo-3-chlorospiro[3.6]decan-7-ol.

Chirality

Spiranes can be chiral, in three distinct ways. First, while nevertheless appearing to be twisted, they yet may have a chiral center making them analogous to any simple chiral compound, and second, while again appearing twisted, the specific location of substituents, as with alkylidenecycloalkanes, may make a spiro compound display central chirality (rather than axial chirality resulting from the twist); third, the substituents of the rings of the spiro compound may be such that the only reason they are chiral arises solely from the twist of their rings, e.g., in the simplest bicyclic case, where two structurally identical rings are attached via their spiro atom, resulting in a twisted presentation of the two rings.  Hence, in the third case, the lack of planarity described above gives rise to what is termed axial chirality in otherwise identical isomeric pair of spiro compounds, because they differ only in the right- versus left-handed "twist" of structurally identical rings (as seen in allenes, sterically hindered biaryls, and alkylidenecycloalkanes as well). Assignment of absolute configuration of spiro compounds has been challenging, but a number of each type have been unequivocally assigned.

Some spiro compounds exhibit axial chirality. Spiroatoms can be the origin of chirality even when they lack the required four different substituents normally observed in chirality. When two rings are identical the priority is determined by a slight modification of the CIP system assigning a higher priority to one ring extension and a lower priority to an extension in the other ring. When rings are dissimilar the regular rules apply.

Preparation
Spiro compounds present unique preparative challenges, whether each ring contributing to its structure is unique or identical, or whether they are carbocyclic or heterocyclic—owing to the practical implications of tetra-functionalizing the central spiro atom (often with four different groups), and of the unique aspects of chirality that apply to these compounds.

Specific methods
Some spiro compounds can be synthesized using the Pinacol-pinacolone rearrangement; for example, spiro[4.5]decane (final compound in following two line scheme) can be synthesized from symmetric 1,2-diols of the sort shown below [e.g., this route's starting material, (1,1′-bicyclopentyl)-1,1′-diol]. Initially, one of the carbinol moieties is protonated, allowing water to leave, and yielding the corresponding carbocation (second structure, first row); this intermediate then undergoes a bond migration, resulting in ring expansion of the adjacent ring, with deprotionation unmasking the ketone functional group to complete the first line of the mechanism. This first product, a spirobicyclic ketone, is a spiro compound in its own right, and yields the further spiro carbinol and the alicyclic spiro hydrocarbon after two further reduction reactions. First, reduction of the carbonyl that ends the mechanism's first line provides the spiro carbinol starting material of the second line, which is needed for reduction to the alkane (shown). This latter reduction is accomplished using lithium aluminum hydride (LiAlH4), via the alcohol tosylate (formed using tosyl chloride). Hence this three reaction sequence provides three spiro compounds (ketone, alcohol, and alkane), of possible research or practical use.

Uses
Spiro forms of lactones and oxazines are frequently used as leuco dyes, frequently displaying chromism—reversible structural change between forms giving rise to colorless and colored appearances, especially in solution.

Spiroaromaticity
Spiroaromaticity in organic chemistry refers to a special case of aromaticity in which conjugation is interrupted by a single spiroatom. Although this spiro center disrupts the continuous overlap of p-orbitals, traditionally thought to be a requirement for aromaticity, considerable thermodynamic stability and many of the spectroscopic, magnetic, and chemical properties associated with aromatic compounds are still observed for such compounds.

Etymology
A spiro compound, or spirane, from the Latin spīra, meaning a twist or coil,  is a chemical compound, typically an organic compound, that presents a twisted structure of two or more rings (a ring system), in which 2 or 3 rings are linked together by one common atom, examples of which are shown at right.

Further reading 
  
 For a further but less stable source of the same text that provides access to the relevant material, see , same access date.
 Examples of spiro natural products and their synthesis:  
 
 The IUPAC documents on naming of spiro compounds:  The full author (Working Party) list and a link to a German translation are provided in a corresponding footnote.

References

External links